Andreas Herczog (11 February 1947 – 12 September 2021) was a Hungarian-born Swiss politician.

Biography
Herczog represented the Canton of Zürich in the National Council from 1979 to 1999, first as a member of the Progressive Organizations of Switzerland and later the Social Democratic Party of Switzerland. In 2010, he became President of the Commission d'arbitrage dans le domaine des chemins de fer. Aside from politics, he founded the architectural firm "Herczog Hubeli" alongside Ernst Hubeli.

Andreas Herczog died from COVID-19 on 12 September 2021, during the COVID-19 pandemic in Switzerland. He was 74.

References

1947 births
2021 deaths
Swiss political people
Swiss communists
Hungarian emigrants to Switzerland
Members of the National Council (Switzerland)
Social Democratic Party of Switzerland politicians
People from Budapest
Deaths from the COVID-19 pandemic in Switzerland